OES may refer to:

Organizations
 Bureau of Oceans and International Environmental and Scientific Affairs, the science bureau within the U.S. Department of State
 Ordo Equitum Solis, a French/Italian alternative music band
 Oregon Episcopal School, a school in Portland, Oregon, US
 Office of Emergency Services, a US governmental agency
 Order of the Eastern Star, a fraternal organisation
 On Every Street, an album by British rock band Dire Straits

Other uses
 Old East Slavic, a language
 Old English Sheepdog, a breed of herding dog often kept as a pet
 Open Enterprise Server, an amalgam of NetWare and Linux
 Occupational Employment Statistics, a US survey
 Optical Emissions Spectrometer, an instrument for testing chemical composition of metals
 Oes, the plural for the name of the letter "O"
 Oes, a type of sequin
 Original Equipment & Service
 Operators of Essential Service, critical infrastructure definition in the NIS Directive

See also

 
 oe (disambiguation)